The 'Dine Out Vancouver Festival, organized by Destination Vancouver, is a citywide food festival held in Vancouver.  It is the largest festival of its type in Canada, and attracts more than 100,000 local and visiting people to Vancouver's restaurants for 17 days each year.

The event allows diners to sample prix-fixe menus from Vancouver's new eateries, neighbourhood favourites, and award-winners, with many menus also featuring suggested BC VQA wine pairings. Dine Out Vancouver Festival also offers hotel room rates and packages, plus a full menu of food-themed events and activities, including culinary tours, cooking lessons, and special dining experiences.

History 

Destination Vancouver first launched DOVF in January 2002 as a way to drive business to local restaurants during the industry's low season. Since then, the number of participating restaurants has increased as the festival has gained popularity in the city and across North America.

In 2014 the festival generated more than $3.5 million in restaurant revenue. From 57 restaurants in 2003, participation in the event grew to 277 restaurants in 2015.

Dine Out Vancouver Festival Events 

 Act I, Eat 1. Long table dining paired with guaranteed seats to award-winning theatrical performances. 
 Grand Tasting on Granville Island. Opening event in the Public Market showcases restaurants and food purveyors on the Island as well as a large selection of BC Wineries.
 Dine Academy. Daily selection of culinary classes, demonstrations and insider tours led by seasoned professionals. 
 Secret Supper Soiree. Diners hop aboard a double-decker bus for a culinary tour at two secret locations.
 Street Food City. Outdoor event that brings many of Vancouver's food carts together in one location, allowing diners to sample from the city's best.
 Salt & Pepper. Selection of food-centric side events, including dinners themed around childhood favourites, salsa classes, social dining, wine tasting and more.

Reception
Dine Out Vancouver has grown in popularity each year and now has a full 17-day schedule of culinary theme events and experiences. The event sometimes has led to problems such as long lines and slow service at the more popular restaurants. The popularity of Asian restaurants has grown through exposure during the festival.

References

External links
 
  Dine Out Vancouver on Wikivoyage

Festivals in Vancouver
Food and drink festivals in Canada